Geosiris aphylla is a species in the flowering plant family Iridaceae, first described in 1894. It is endemic to Madagascar.

Geosiris aphylla is sometimes called the earth-iris. It is a small myco-heterotroph lacking chlorophyll and obtaining its nutrients from fungi in the soil.

Description
Its rhizomes are slender and scaly, and stems are simple or branched. The leaves are alternate, but having no use, are reduced and scale-like (hence the epithet "aphylla," meaning "without leaves"). The  flowers are light purple.

Range and habitat
Geosiris aphylla is native to central and eastern Madagascar. It lives in forest humus in humid lowland and montane forests, between 400 and 1200 meters elevation.

References

External links
 Missouri Botanical Garden photo of Geosiris flowers
 A different picture

Iridaceae
Parasitic plants
Endemic flora of Madagascar
Flora of the Madagascar lowland forests
Flora of the Madagascar subhumid forests
Plants described in 1894
Taxa named by Henri Ernest Baillon